Mysore Mallige is a 1992 Indian Kannada-language drama film directed and co-written by T. S. Nagabharana and produced by Srihari Khoday. The story is based on a 1942 work of the same title by the acclaimed poet K. S. Narasimhaswamy. The film was an attempt to create a story based on the poetry.

The film's cast consisted mainly of actors from a theatrical background including Girish Karnad, Sudharani, Anand, Sundar Raj and H. G. Dattatreya.

The film was well received upon release. It went on to win National Film Award for Best Feature Film in Kannada and the lyrical works by Narasimha Swamy fetched him the National Film Award for Best Lyrics. The film also received multiple Karnataka State Film Awards including Best Film, Best Actress and other technical categories.

On the occasion of 101st birth anniversary of K. S. Narasimha Swamy, a leading Kannada daily reported that this movie was the inspiration for the 1994 Hindi movie 1942: A Love Story.

Plot 
Mysoora Mallige is woven from the lyrical poems of K. S. Narasimha Swamy, one of the modern Kannada poets inspired to sing by the love of his land.

Padma is a village girl who is in love with the poet Manju, a fervent patriot. Her father is a village accountant, an instrument of the village's feudal structure, and he opposes Manju's activities. He tries to arrange his daughter's marriage to a man of his own views, but Padma and Manju are united, with the help of Chennaiah, a bangle seller.

In an attempt to save Chennaiah, who becomes involved with nationalists, Manju is wounded and given up for lost. The poet's works are later published by his wife (Padma). Ultimately in the book release function Padma and Manju both united happily.

Cast 
 Girish Karnad as Padma's father
 Sudharani as Padma
 Anand as Manju
 Sundar Raj
 H. G. Dattatreya
 Shankar Rao
 Kasaragodu Chinna
 Kishori Ballal
 Pankaja
 Sripathi Ballal
 Shimoga Venkatesh

Soundtrack 
The music of the film was composed by C. Ashwath. All the 9 songs composed for this film have been from the literary work collection of poet K. S. Narasimha Swamy.

Awards
The film has won the following awards since its release.

39th National Film Awards
 National Film Award for Best Feature Film in Kannada
 Silver Lotus Award – Best Lyricist — K. S. Narasimhaswamy

1991–92 Karnataka State Film Awards
 Second Best Film
 Best Actress — Sudharani
 Best Cinematographer — B. C. Gowrishankar
 Best Sound Recording — Aravinda Kiggal and K. S. Krishnamurthy
 Best Editor — Suresh Urs

40th Filmfare Awards South
 Best Film – Kannada
 Best Director – Kannada — T. S. Nagabharana
 Best Actress – Kannada — Sudharani
 Best Music Director – Kannada — C. Ashwath
 This film screened at IFFI 1992 Panorama section.

References

External links 
 
 Mysore Mallige songs

1992 films
1990s Kannada-language films
Films scored by C. Ashwath
Films based on poems
Best Kannada Feature Film National Film Award winners